Hapsidopareiontidae is an extinct family of tuditanomorph microsaurs. Hapsidopareiontids are known from the Early Permian of the United States and possibly Germany and the Czech Republic.

Hapsidopareiontids are characterized by a large temporal embayment near the cheek region in which the quadratojugal is greatly reduced or absent. Members of Ostodolepidae, another microsaur family, also possess temporal embayments, but they not as extensive as those of hapsidopareiontids, which extend into the skull roof. In hapsidopareiontids, the embayment may have provided space for an enlarged jaw adductor musculature, although certain characteristics of the skull do not support this idea. Hapsidopareion and Llistrofus both possess this embayment, but in Saxonerpeton, the temporal region is complete. The lack of a temporal embayment may exclude Saxonerpeton from Hapsidopareiontidae; Bolt and Rieppel (2009) considered Hapsidopareiontidae to include only Hapsidopareion and Llistrofus because of this.

References

Prehistoric amphibians of Europe
Prehistoric amphibians of North America
Permian amphibians
Cisuralian first appearances
Cisuralian extinctions